Sokol Bulku (born 6 January 1978) is a retired Albanian footballer who played the majority of his career with KF Tirana, also having stints at Partizani Tirana, KF Elbasani and Kastrioti Krujë.

Managerial career
He was the assistant manager of KF Tirana between 2011 and 2013, as well as the interim manager in November 2013.

Personal life
His younger brother is Albanian international Ervin Bulku, whom he played with at KF Tirana between 1998 and 2004.

Honours
KF Tirana
Albanian Superliga (5): 1996–97, 1998–99, 1999–2000, 2002–03, 2003–04
Albanian Cup (4): 1995–96, 1998–99, 2000–01, 2001–02
Albanian Supercup (3): 2000, 2002, 2003

Partizani
Albanian Supercup (1): 2004

References

1978 births
Living people
Footballers from Tirana
Albanian footballers
Association football midfielders
KF Tirana players
FK Partizani Tirana players
KF Elbasani players
KS Kastrioti players
Albanian football managers
KF Tirana managers
Kategoria Superiore players
Kategoria Superiore managers